Oregon is a state located in the Western United States. All population data is based on the 2020 census and 2010 census and the Census Bureau's annual estimates. All area data is based on the 2010 US Gazetteer files. There are 241 municipalities.

List of incorporated cities ranked by population

Former cities
Cities that have disincorporated.

Albina
Beaver Hill
Damascus (Damascus' disincorporation was reversed as of 2019, then restored in 2020)
East Portland
Freewater
Glenada
Hammond
Juntura
Lemati
Linnton
Milton
Orenco
Rajneeshpuram
St. Johns
Sellwood
Vanport
West Salem
Willamette
Winchester

See also
List of counties in Oregon
List of census-designated places in Oregon
List of ghost towns in Oregon

References

 
Oregon
Oregon
Cities

cs:Seznam měst v Oregonu
de:Liste der Städte in Oregon
fr:Liste des villes de l'Oregon
io:Listo di urbi en Oregon
id:Daftar kota di Oregon
it:Lista delle città dell'Oregon
pt:Anexo:Lista de cidades do Oregon
vi:Danh sách các thành phố và các cộng đồng chưa hợp nhất tại Oregon